The 2016 Lockdown was a professional wrestling pay-per-view (PPV) event produced by Total Nonstop Action Wrestling (TNA), which took place on April 23, 2006, from the Impact Zone in Orlando, Florida. It was the second annual event under the Lockdown chronology. Eight matches were featured on the event's card. In the tradition of Lockdown events, every match took place inside a steel structure with six sides, known as Six Sides of Steel. This event also marked the TNA debut of Christy Hemme. The event was featured in the House episode "Act Your Age".

In October 2017, with the launch of the Global Wrestling Network, the event became available to stream on demand.

Results

Xscape match
1.

References

External links
ImpactWrestling.com - the official website of Total Nonstop Action Wrestling
Results/Details at OWW

Impact Wrestling Lockdown
2006 in professional wrestling in Florida
Professional wrestling shows in Orlando, Florida
April 2006 events in the United States
2006 Total Nonstop Action Wrestling pay-per-view events